John Zacherle (sometimes credited as John Zacherley; September 26, 1918 – October 27, 2016) was an American television host, radio personality, singer, and voice actor. He was best known for his long career as a television horror host, often broadcasting horror films in Philadelphia and New York City in the 1950s and 1960s. Best known for his character of "Roland/Zacherley", he also did voice work for films, and recorded the top ten novelty rock and roll song "Dinner With Drac" in 1958. He also edited two collections of horror stories, Zacherley's Vulture Stew and Zacherley's Midnight Snacks.

Biography 
Zacherle was born in Philadelphia, Pennsylvania, United States, the youngest of four children of a bank clerk and his wife. He grew up in Philadelphia's Germantown neighborhood, where he went to high school. He received a bachelor's degree in English literature from the University of Pennsylvania. In World War II, he enlisted in the U.S. Army and served in North Africa and Europe. After the war, he returned to Philadelphia and joined a local repertory theatre company. 

In 1954 he gained his first television role at WCAU-TV in Philadelphia, where he was hired as an actor playing several roles (one was an undertaker) in Action in the Afternoon, a Western produced by the station and aired in the New York City market. Three years later, he was hired as the host of WCAU's Shock Theater, which debuted on October 7, 1957. As the host, Zacherle appeared wearing a long black undertaker's coat as the character "Roland" (pronounced "Ro-land") who lived in a crypt with his wife "My Dear" (unseen, lying in her coffin)  and his lab assistant, Igor. The hosting of the black-and-white show involved interrupting the film to do numerous stylized horror-comedy gags parodying the film; an influential change which pioneered a now-standard television genre. In the opening sequence, Zacherle as Roland would descend a long round staircase to the crypt. The producers erred on the side of goriness, showing fake severed heads with blood simulated with Hershey's chocolate syrup. During the comedy "cut-ins" during the movie, the soundtrack continued to play on the air, while the visual feed switched briefly to a shot of Zacherle as Roland in the middle of a related humorous stunt, such as riding a tombstone, or singing "My Funny Valentine" to his wife in her coffin. The show ran for 92 broadcasts through 1958. 

He was a close colleague of Philadelphia broadcaster Dick Clark, and sometimes filled in for Clark on road touring shows of Clark's American Bandstand in the 1960s. Clark reportedly gave Zacherle his nickname of "The Cool Ghoul". In 1958, partly with the assistance and backing of Clark, Zacherle cut "Dinner with Drac" for Cameo Records, backed by Dave Appell. At first, Clark thought the recording – in which Zacherle recites humorously grisly limericks to rock and roll accompaniment – was too gory to play on Bandstand, and made Zacherle return to the studio to cut a second tamer version. Eventually both versions were released simultaneously as backsides on the same 45, and the record broke the top ten nationally. Zacherle later released several LPs mixing horror sound effects with novelty songs.

Move to New York
The purchase of WCAU by CBS in 1958 prompted Zacherle to leave Philadelphia for WABC-TV in New York, where the station added a "y" to the end of his name in the credits. He continued the format of the Shock Theater, after March 1959 titled Zacherley at Large, with "Roland" becoming "Zacherley" and his wife "My Dear" becoming "Isobel". He also began appearing in motion pictures, including Key to Murder alongside several of his former Action in the Afternoon colleagues. A regular feature of his shows continued to be his parodic interjection of himself into old horror films. He would run the movie and have "conversations" with the monster characters. He kept his "wife" in a coffin on stage. His co-star "Gasport" was in a burlap sack hanging from a rope, occasionally emitting moans. The on-air conversation consisted of Zacherle repeating the moans he heard from the sack. 

In a 1960 promotional stunt for his move to WOR-TV, Zacherley—by then, a Baby Boomer idol—staged a presidential campaign. His "platform" recording can be found on the album Spook Along with Zacherley, which originally included a Zacherley for President book and poster set which is highly collectible today. Also, in 1960, he was a guest on CBS-TV's What's My Line, on the October 30 broadcast, as the final guest. (Two of the panelists had to disqualify themselves, as they knew his identity.) 

In 1963, he hosted animated cartoons, as well as Chiller Theatre on WPIX-TV.

In 1965, he hosted a teenage dance show for three years at WNJU-TV in Newark called Disc-O-Teen, hosting the show in full costume and using the teenage show participants in his skits.

In December 1968, Zacherle moved to radio as the morning host for progressive rock WNEW-FM. In the summer of 1969, he became the station night broadcaster (10 PM–2 AM); in June 1971, he switched his show to WPLJ-FM, where he stayed for ten years.

On February 14, 1970 he appeared at Fillmore East music hall in New York City to introduce the Grateful Dead; his introduction can be heard on the album Dick's Picks Volume 4.

1980s and beyond
In the early 1980s, he played a wizard on Captain Kangaroo, appearing without his Roland/Zacherley costume and make-up. He continued to perform in character at Halloween broadcasts in New York and Philadelphia in the 1980s and 1990s, once narrating Edgar Allan Poe's The Raven while backed up by the Philadelphia Orchestra.

In 1983, he portrayed himself in the feature length horror comedy Geek Maggot Bingo produced and directed by Nick Zedd in sequences shot in Zacherle's apartment on the Upper West Side.
 
In 1985 he hosted a special for Newark, New Jersey music video station WWHT U68 entitled "The Thirteenth Hour".

In 1986, he hosted a direct-to-video program called Horrible Horror, where he performed Zacherley monologues in between clips from public domain sci-fi and horror films.

In 1988, he struck up a friendship with B-movie horror director Frank Henenlotter, voicing the puppet "Aylmer", a slug-like drug-dealing and brain-eating parasite, one of the lead characters in Henenlotter's 1988 horror-comedy film Brain Damage, and cameos in his 1990 comedy Frankenhooker, appropriately playing a TV weatherman who specializes in forecasts for mad scientists.

In late 1992, Zacherle joined the staff of "K-Rock", WXRK, at a time when the roster included other free-form radio DJs including Pete Fornatale, Jimmy Fink, Vin Scelsa (with whom he'd worked at WPLJ) and Meg Griffin. For the next four years he hosted a Saturday morning show called "Spirit Of The Sixties".  He departed in January 1996 when the station switched to an alternative rock format and hired all new jocks.

In 2010, Zacherly starred in the documentary, The Aurora Monsters: The Model Craze That Gripped the World. The film was written and produced by Dennis Vincent and Cortlandt Hull, owner of the Witch's Dungeon Classic Movie Museum in Bristol, Connecticut. The documentary includes a number of short pieces featuring Zacherly and his puppet co-host Gorgo, of Bill Diamond Productions. The film went on to win a Rondo award.

Zacherle continued to make appearances at conventions through 2015, and his collectibles, including model kits, T-shirts, and posters, continue to sell. The book Goodnight, Whatever You Are by Richard Scrivani, chronicling the life and times of The Cool Ghoul, debuted at the Chiller Theatre Expo in Secaucus, New Jersey, in October 2006. Scrivani and Tom Weaver followed it up with the scrapbook-style "The Z Files: Treasures from Zacherley's Archives" in 2012.

The comic book anthology, Zacherley's Midnite Terrors (created by Joseph M. Monks, and featuring top artists like Basil Gogos, Ken Kelly, William Stout and Mike Koneful), was created solely as a tribute to "Zach". Three issues were published, and Zacherley acted in a commercial to promote them.

Zacherley continued to make occasional on-air appearances, usually around Halloween, including a two-hour show at WCBS-FM with Ron Parker on October 31, 2007. (By this point, the 89-year-old was one of the very few people left in radio that was older than the medium itself.) Zacherley and Chiller Theatre returned to the WPIX airwaves on October 25, 2008 for a special showing of the 1955 Universal Pictures science fiction classic Tarantula!.

The Broadcast Pioneers of Philadelphia inducted Zacherle into their Hall of Fame in 2010.

He died on October 27, 2016, at his home in Manhattan at the age of 98.

Legacy
He was the uncle of My Little Pony creator Bonnie Zacherle.

Partial Zacherley at Large episode guide
Channel 9's resident film historian Chris Steinbrunner compiled a listing of all Zacherley's shows from their start to New Year's 1960:

{| class="wikitable plainrowheaders" style="width: 100%; margin-right: 0;"
|-
! style="background: #575757; color: #ffffff;"| Featured film
! style="background: #575757; color: #ffffff;"| Original airdate
|-

{{Episode list
|Title=Avalanche'
|OriginalAirDate=
|ShortSummary=Zacherley welcomes his always-failing son home from Transylvania University for the Christmas holidays and opens some rather unusual gifts. 
The Film: Bruce Cabot, Veda Ann Borg, Roscoe Karns - Federal agents investigate murder at a snowbound mountain lodge.  (C&C) 
|LineColor = 575757
}}
|}

These shows were later syndicated to KHJ-TV, the RKO General station in Los Angeles.

Short story collections
Zacherle edited two short story collections for Ballantine Books in 1960. Listed here are their contents.

Discography

AlbumsSpook Along with Zacherley (Elektra: EKL-190) 1960Monster Mash (12 songs) (Parkway LP P-7018) 1962Scary Tales (Parkway LP P-7023) 1962Monster Mash (10 songs; partial re-issue of Parkway album) (Wyncote LP W-9050) 1964

Singles
"Igor"/"Dinner with Drac" (Cameo 130-1)
"Dinner with Drac Pt.1"/"Pt.2" (Cameo 130-2)
"Eighty-Two Tombstones"/"Lunch with Mother Goose" (Cameo 139)
"Hurry Burry Baby"/"Dinner With Drac" (Parkway 853)
"I Was a Teenage Cave Man"/"Dummy Doll" (Cameo 145)
"Surfboard 109"/"Clementine" (Parkway 885)
"Scary Tales from Mother Goose"/"Monster Monkey" (Parkway 888)

CDsTwist Collection (OOZ 617) 2001Monster Mash/Scary Tales (ACE CDCHD 1294) 2010Monster Mash Party (Transylvania 4-5709)Dinner With Zach (Transylvania 6-5000)Spook Along with Zacherley'' (Collector's Choice Music)

See also

Vampira
Elvira, Mistress of the Dark
Dr. Gangrene
Morgus the Magnificent
Dr. Shock

References

External links

Welcome to the Home of Zacherley: The Cool Ghoul

Halloween Horror Hosts Rise Again
Anthopology 101: From B(allantine) to Z(acherley) by Bud Webster at Galactic Central
Broadcast Pioneers of Philadelphia website
New York Radio Archive: WXRK-FM 92.3

1918 births
2016 deaths
American male television actors
United States Army personnel of World War II
American radio DJs
American television personalities
Horror hosts
Male actors from Philadelphia
United States Army soldiers
University of Pennsylvania School of Arts and Sciences alumni
20th-century American male actors